The Mercedes-Benz M271 engine is a straight-4 automobile piston engine family used in the 2000s (decade).

All M271 engines are built in Untertürkheim, Germany. The family has a cast aluminium engine block and aluminium DOHC cylinder heads with 4 valves per cylinder and variable valve timing and a coil-on-plug ignition system.

KE18ML (271.95X) 
The KE18ML is a  version.

It uses sequential fuel injection, is supercharged and intercooled, and features fracture-split forged steel connecting rods.
A version running on natural gas was introduced in the German market in 2002.

Applications:
 2002 Mercedes-Benz CLK-Class (W209) CLK 200 KOMPRESSOR
 2002 Mercedes-Benz C-Class (W203) C 180 KOMPRESSOR, C 200 KOMPRESSOR, C 230 KOMPRESSOR
 2002 Mercedes-Benz C-Class Sportcoupé CLC 180 KOMPRESSOR, CLC 200 KOMPRESSOR, 
 2002 Mercedes-Benz E-Class (W211) E 200 KOMPRESSOR
 2004 Mercedes-Benz E-Class (W211) E 200 NGT (bi-fuel - gasoline + natural gas)
 2004 Mercedes-Benz SLK-Class (R171) SLK 200 KOMPRESSOR
 2005 Mercedes-Benz C-Class KOMPRESSOR gasoline
 2007 Mercedes-Benz C-Class (W204) C 180 KOMPRESSOR, C 200 KOMPRESSOR
 2008 Mercedes-Benz CLC-Class CLC 180 KOMPRESSOR, CLC 200 KOMPRESSOR

DE18ML (271.942) 
This engine had the same dimensions as E18ML and almost the same features, but used CGI (Stratified Charged Gasoline Injection) gasoline direct injection. The production ceased in 2005.

Applications:
 2003 Mercedes-Benz C-Class Sportcoupé C 200 CGI
 2003 Mercedes-Benz C-Class (W203) C 200 CGI
 2003 Mercedes-Benz CLK-Class (W209) CLK 200 CGI

KE16ML (271.910) 
The KE16 is a  version introduced in 2008. It shares the same features with the KE18ML version, like supercharger and multi-point fuel injection.

Applications:
 2008 Mercedes-Benz CLC-Class CLC 160
 2008 Mercedes-Benz C-Class (W204) C 180 KOMPRESSOR

DE18LA (M271Evo, 271.8XX) 
This is the last version of M271 engine family. Dimensions are the same as E18ML and DE18ML, but the supercharger has been replaced with a turbocharger; like the DE18ML it uses the CGI (Stratified Charged Gasoline Injection) gasoline direct injection.

Applications:
 2009-2013 Mercedes-Benz C-Class (W204) C 180 CGI, C 200 CGI, C 250 CGI
 2009-2013 Mercedes-Benz E-Class (W212) E 200 CGI, E 250 CGI
 2010-2013 Mercedes-Benz E-Class (C207) E200 CGI
 2009-2013 Mercedes-Benz E-Class (C207) E250 CGI
2011-2015 Mercedes-Benz SLK-Class (R172) SLK 200, SLK 250

Other uses 
The engine in 2.0-litre naturally aspirated form is used by German automotive company HWA Team as the basis for a Mercedes-Benz motor racing engine and has been the engine used widely in Formula 3 motor racing powering championship winning drivers across Europe and further afield.

See also 
 List of Mercedes-Benz engines

References 
5. Old link above not working##https://www.hwaag.com/en/98-motorsports-c/326-formula-3-engines-of-success.html#:~:text=History%3A%20The%20first%20Mercedes%2DAMG,Formula%203%20Championship%20at%20Hockenheim.

M271
Straight-four engines
Gasoline engines by model